The Yebatan Hydropower Station is the hydropower project with the largest installed capacity in the upper reaches of the Jinsha River. It is located at the junction of Baiyu County in Sichuan Province and Konjo County in Tibet Autonomous Region.

Since it is an arch dam, it is also called as the Yebatan Arch Dam, with a maximum height of 217 meters. The total investment in this project is ¥ 33.36 billion, and its first generating unit is expected to be operational by 2025, and the total installed capacity is 2.24 million kilowatts.

History
In November 2016, the National Development and Reform Commission approved the construction of the Lawa Hydropower Station. On June 27, 2017, construction of the Yebatan Hydropower Station officially began. 

On March 30, 2019, the upstream cofferdam of the plant was intercepted and the main construction of the project was fully underway.

References 

Jinsha River
Dams in China
Hydroelectric power stations in Tibet
Hydroelectric power stations in Sichuan